Total Divas is an American reality television series that premiered on July 28, 2013, on E!. The series gave viewers an inside look of the lives of WWE Divas from their work within WWE to their personal lives. Behind the scene footage of the Divas is also included.

Production

Total Divas was revealed in May 2013 as a part of a partnership with E!. It was announced on August 14, 2013, that E! had ordered an additional six episodes, bring the first season to a total of 14 episodes. The summer finale aired on September 15, 2013, with the season continuing on November 10, 2013. WWE announcer Josh Mathews revealed on November 20, 2013, that Total Divas had been renewed for a second season. Unlike other WWE programs, most of the performers use their real names instead of their ring names, leading to Cameron, Naomi, Natalya, Jimmy Uso, and Tyson Kidd being referred to as Ariane, Trinity, Nattie, Jon, and TJ respectively.

Cast

Main cast

 Brie Bella (Brianna Danielson)
 Nikki Bella (Stephanie Garcia-Colace)
 Cameron (Ariane Andrew)
 Naomi (Trinity Fatu)
 Natalya (Natalie Neidhart-Wilson)
 Eva Marie (Natalie Coyle)
 JoJo (Joseann Offerman)

Recurring cast
 Daniel Bryan (Brie's husband)
 Vincent Isayan (Cameron's boyfriend)
 John Cena (Nikki's fiance)
 Jimmy Uso (Naomi's husband)
 Tyson Kidd (Natalya's husband)
 Jonathan Coyle (Eva Marie's husband)
 Mark Carrano (WWE Senior Director of Talent Relations)
 Jane Geddes (WWE Vice President of Talent Relations)
 Sandra Gray (WWE's seamstress)

Guest stars
 Alicia Fox (Victoria Crawford)
 Jim Neidhart (Nattie's father)
 Ellie Neidhart (Nattie's mother)
 Kathy Colace (Brie & Nikki's mother)

Episodes

Ratings

References

External links

 
 

2013 American television seasons
Total Divas